Angora may refer to:

Places
Angora, the historic name of Ankara, the capital city of Turkey
Angora, Philadelphia
Angora (SEPTA station), a commuter rail station
Angora, Minnesota
Angora Township, Minnesota
Angora, Nebraska
Angora Lakes, a set of freshwater lakes in the Sierra Nevada, on the border of California and Nevada
Angora Fire, a 2007 forest fire near the lakes

Fauna
Angora wool, from an Angora rabbit
Angora rabbit, one of at least 11 breeds of rabbit
Angora goat, a breed of goat
Angora ferret, a long-haired breed of ferret
Turkish Angora, a breed of cat originally known as just Angora
Oriental Longhair, a breed of cat formerly known as the British Angora

Media
Tygodnik Angora, a Polish language publication
Angora (band), a musical group
Drengene fra Angora, a Danish satire show

See also
Angara (disambiguation)
Ankara (disambiguation)
Angola (disambiguation)